Lazaroff is a surname. Notable people with the surname include:

Barbara Lazaroff, American interior designer and restauranteur
Jorge Lazaroff (1950–1989), Uruguayan composer, singer, and guitarist
Shimon Lazaroff, American rabbi